Dr Chaturbhuj Sahay (Hindi: चतुर्भुज सहाय );  known as Guru Maharaj, 3 November 1883 – 24 September 1957, was an Indian mystic and capable master (समर्थ गुरु). Due to the spiritual atmosphere at home the love of God was sown within him in early childhood, and his heart was colored with a slight color of detachment.  From a young age he used to meet Saints and Yogiraj or learned ascetics (Sanyasi), and was influenced by several religious traditions.

He started spiritual organization Ramashram Satsang, Mathura in the name of his Guru Mahatma Ram Chandra (Lalaji), where the method of transfer of Soul Power has evolved to such an extent that the soul power is transferred not only on one to one basis but from one to many, which has now acquired India wide influence in the spread of spirituality and is spreading to other countries.

The system of meditation he preached is a synthesis between Karma (action), Upasana (devotion) and Gyaan (knowledge),  'Love' is mingled in all its methods, central focus is on the Spiritual Master, who by Soul-Power uplifts the aspirants and makes them experience the higher stages of spirituality.

Early life

Dr Chaturbhuj Sahay was born on 3 November 1883 ( samvat 1940, Kartik (month), Shukla Paksha, Chaturthi ), in the village of Chamkari, in the Etah Province, of "North-Western Provinces" (of Agra) into a well to do, pious, and orthodox Kulshreshtha family. His father's name was Shreeyut Ramprasad Ji. His father was an ascetic and an accomplished astrologer, he wrote some books on astrology that are available today as manuscript.

He was taught Urdu and Persian language by a Mawlawi and Devanagari by a Pandit. Later he studied medicine and practiced in the field of health.

He was married to Smt. Indira Devi and had two daughters and three sons. His eldest son Dr Brijendra Kumar retired as Medical Superintendent of a Government Hospital in Mathura, his second son Shri Hemendra Kumar helped him in spreading his spiritual message, and the third and the youngest son Dr Narendra Kumar retired as a Professor from Jaipur University. His three sons treated their father as their Guru and whenever time permitted traveled India wide to spread the message of their Guru. They lovingly called their father Chaachaa ji.  His two daughters Smt. Shraddha and Smt. Sudha also were married into spiritually inclined families.

Religious practices and teachers
At the age of eighteen he had to go to his maternal grandparents place at Fatehgarh, and there he remained for many years. The cleanser of sinners, the pure dark Bhagirathi Ganges flowed a furlong away from the house. For his recreation, at times in the evenings, he would go there. Ascetics (Sadhus) and Mahatmas were also there at the shores of Ganges. Out of them most were materialistic and hypocrites, but even then, at times, good Saints and Yogi or learned ascetics (practitioners of Sannyasa) too came there. He liked to serve such saints, and to keep their company (Satsang) and to converse with them. He learned from them many types of Pranayama, many methods of Rajyoga and Hatha yoga, and to some extent he also practiced them,
but he could not be satisfied by these people. Their methods were not favorable for him. Therefore, he could neither connect with any of them, nor make anyone his Guru.

Arya Samaj
Many of his friends followed Arya Samaj. In their association the views of Arya Samaj impressed him, and he too became a follower of Arya Samaj. During those days Arya Samaj was a good institution. Its members were straight forward, honest, and simple, and followed Karmakand (Karmakanda (Sanskrit) is that part of the Śruti or Vedas writings which relates to ceremonial acts and sacrificial rites). During those days its members did not search for other people's faults like those of the present days, and they did have the attitude ‘to do something for one’s self’. They, with body and mind, used to serve others. The inclination to work was there also within him; therefore, he too joined with them began shoulder to shoulder and started helping them in their cause. He worked for many years in Fatehgarh and Agra within the high circle of Arya Samaj.

He did not like fights that disturbed the peace. These started becoming a hurdle in his spiritual practice. Therefore, he resigned and separated from them.

Guru
He met his Guru Mahatma  Ram Chandra (Lalaji) ji around the year 1910 or 1911. Wife of Samarth Guru Mahatma Ramchandra Ji was unwell. In that connection he first met with Mahatma Ramchandra Ji, his "Shri Gurudeva", in the capacity of a medical practitioner. He continued to meet Mahatma Ramchandra Ji for two years regularly, but he did not come to know more than this that Mahatma Ramchandra Ji was a very simple and honest person. Mahatma Ramchandra Ji had put a garb of service and householder around him and his real form was not visible. His neighbors, relatives, and friends those who sat near him day and night, all of them only knew him as a good person and that is all.

Pujya Dr. Chaturbhuj Sahab ji was one of the seniormost disciple of Lalaji Maharaj. His life was devoted towards spiritual upliftment of mankind. According to the directions of Lalaji Maharaj, he tried very hard to spread the divine message of Pujya Lalaji Maharaj  to as many people as possible. He has a number of spiritual publications for the benefit of the common people. According to lalaji Maharaj ’s wishes he translated the core principles of Pujya Lalaji’s mission in hindi which was originally in Urdu so that it could be accessible to common people.

Principles
 God is energy, has no name or form, whatever name one keeps is alright.
 To seek God one need not renounce household and wander in the forest; one can live at home and still reach God.
 You have not seen God, hence first meet that person who has seen God. Only that person can enable you to see God.
 Infuse inner happiness into your life, it is a divine virtue.
 Peace is in the knowledge, you will not get it from outside. Knowledge is within you. For this you will have to make internal efforts.
 Devote more time to worldly activities, give some time to these efforts. But for this much time forget the world.
 Two activities are very important for spiritual seeker – first, earn an honest living and second, keep busy with work.
 Knowledge is infinite. If one Guru could not complete it then seek the guidance of another Guru. However, after finding a fully self-realized Guru one should not seek another Guru.
 Do all worldly work but with a spirit of service, not as owner.
 Live in this world as a guest. Think of everything as belonging to someone else. Leave "me and mine," and learn the lesson of "you and yours".

See also
 Mahatma Ramchandra
Surat Shabd Yoga

References

1883 births
1957 deaths
People from Etah district